Tuffah (translation: "the Apple") is a district of Gaza City, located northeast of the Old City and is divided into eastern and western halves. Prior to its expansion and the demolition of the Old City's walls, Tuffah was one of the three walled quarters of Gaza, the other two being al-Daraj and Zeitoun. Tuffah was situated in the northeastern section of the Old City. The local pronunciation of the district's name is at-tuffen.

Tuffah has existed since early Mamluk rule in Gaza in the 13th century. The southern part of Tuffah was called "ad-Dabbaghah". According to Ottoman tax records in the late 16th century, it was a small neighborhood containing 57 households. The ad-Dabbaghah neighborhood contained Gaza's slaughterhouse and tanners' facilities during the Ottoman era (1517-1917). The northern subdivision of Tuffah was called "Bani Amir." 

The 14th-century Ibn Marwan Mosque is located in the district as is the 13th-century Aybaki Mosque. Home to the British War Cemetery, Tuffah also contains Gaza's public library and a number of Palestinian Red Crescent schools.

References

Bibliography

External links
SWP map 19, IAA
SWP map 19, Wikimedia commons

Neighborhoods of Gaza City